Planalto Mirandes is a Portuguese wine region centered on the town of Miranda do Douro in the Trás-os-Montes e Alto Douro region. The region was initially a separate Indicação de Proveniencia Regulamentada (IPR) region, but in 2006, it became one of three subregions of the Trás-os-Montes DOC, which has the higher Denominação de Origem Controlada (DOC) status. Its name may still be indicated together with that of Trás-os-Montes, as Trás-os-Montes-Planalto Mirandês.

Located in the very north eastern corner of Portugal, the region borders Spain and produces full bodied red and white wines.

Grapes
The principle grapes of the Planalto Mirandes region include Bastardo, Gouveio, Malvasia Fina, Mourisco Tinto, Rabo de Ovelha, Tinta Amarela, Touriga Francesa, Touriga Nacional and Viosinho.

See also
List of Portuguese wine regions

References

Wine regions of Portugal